This is a list of notable terminal emulators. Most used terminal emulators on Linux and Unix-like systems are GNOME Terminal on GNOME and GTK-based environments, Konsole on KDE, and xfce4-terminal on Xfce as well as xterm.

List

See also 
 Web-based SSH

References

External links
 Linux console escape and control sequences
 List of X11 terminals available on Gentoo Linux
 List of X11 terminals available on archlinux
 Guide to Windows terminals
 The Grumpy Editor's guide to terminal emulators, 2004
 Comprehensive Linux Terminal Performance Comparison, 2007
 x11-terminals

Emulators, Terminal